José "Joy" Aparecido dos Santos, also commonly known as simply "Joy" (born 15 November 1946) is a Brazilian basketball player. He competed in the men's tournament at the 1968 Summer Olympics and the 1972 Summer Olympics.

References

External links
 

1946 births
Living people
Brazilian men's basketball players
1970 FIBA World Championship players
Olympic basketball players of Brazil
Basketball players at the 1968 Summer Olympics
Basketball players at the 1972 Summer Olympics
Basketball players at the 1971 Pan American Games
Pan American Games gold medalists for Brazil
Pan American Games medalists in basketball
Basketball players from São Paulo
Sport Club Corinthians Paulista basketball players
Medalists at the 1971 Pan American Games